CEPAS, the Specification for Contactless e-Purse Application, is a Singaporean specification for an electronic money smart card.  CEPAS has been deployed island-wide, replacing the previous original EZ-Link card effective 1 October 2009.

Function
The CEPAS provides the command sets and data bytes that can be used for contactless e-purse applications, and focuses on the debit and credit areas. The most recent version of the standard is CEPAS 2.0. The standard allows for the interoperability of multi-purpose stored value (MPSV) card payment schemes from different card issuers and system operators.

Background
CEPAS is spearheaded by the Infocomm Development Authority of Singapore (IDA), and is one of the key next generation e-Payment initiatives under Singapore's iN2015 infocomm masterplan led by IDA. The vision of CEPAS is for Singaporeans to have a single MPSV card for use all around Singapore for micro-payments. This includes transit (bus, MRT, LRT), taxi, motoring (ERP, parking), retail, and other services.

CEPAS is a result of close collaboration by IDA with different industry players and the Land Transport Authority (LTA). The other key collaborators are the Cards & Personal Identification Technical Committee (CPITC) under the Singapore IT Standards Committee (ITSC), Network for Electronic Transfers (NETS) and EZ-Link Pte Ltd (EZ-Link). CEPAS was published by SPRING Singapore as SS 518 and was officially launched during the CEPAS Launch & Next Generation e-Payment seminar on 27 June 2006, held at Suntec Singapore International Convention and Exhibition Centre.

Current and future payment landscape
The current micro-payment landscape in Singapore is fragmented with different standards, with two main players, NETS and EZ-Link. EZ-Link controls the transit space and NETS controls the motoring (ERP, parking) space. NETS also dominates the retail space, with EZ-Link having limited presence. Cards and readers from both providers cannot currently interoperate and consumers hold different cards for payment of different services and goods.

CEPAS aims to open and level the micro-payment playing field.  For example, NETS card holders will be able to use their cards to pay for transit and EZ-Link card holders for retail and motoring payments.  For merchants, the overall operation cost is intended to be lower and the market space larger.

CEPAS-compliant EZ-Link cards have been available for sale from 29 December 2008.

Technical details of CEPAS 2.0
The commands in this standard follow the convention in ISO/IEC 7816-4: 2005. The main commands are "Read Purse", "Debit Purse" and "Credit Purse". The design allows for partial refund and is limited to the most recent amount debited. The "AutoLoad" and "Cumulative Debit" features are also available. In this standard, key management for controlling e-purse operations is flexible and the final details are decided by the card issuer. Atomicity is a key focus in this standard to ensure reliability of transactions across multiple interfaces.

Transaction processing methods

Card-based Offline Debit
The CEPAS-compliant EZ-Link and NETS FlashPay cards released in 2009 operate as offline cards, intended for farecards in transit systems and micropayments in retail. As transactions are processed offline without having to maintain an active network connection to the bank for processing, lower transaction fees are incurred compared to debit and credit cards.

Account-based Online Debit
In 2017, the Land Transport Authority began an account-based ticketing trial to expand the range of e-payment options and eliminate the need for top-ups in transit. In 2019, the system was officially launched as SimplyGo. It allowed credit cards (Visa, Mastercard) and mobile wallets (Apple Pay, Fitbit Pay, Garmin Pay, Google Pay, Samsung Pay) to be used in the transit system, in addition to the existing CEPAS EZ-Link and NETS FlashPay cards.

In September 2020, LTA began a trial to expand the account-based ticketing system to CEPAS cards, which were conventionally based on a card-based ticketing system. The reason given for pushing the account-based ticketing system was that it removed the need for physical trips to top-up machines. As the card information is stored on a central server under account-based ticketing, access to travel history and card top-ups can be done remotely through mobile apps, without needing the card to be physically present.

The account-based EZ-Link Card was launched in January 2021, and the account-based NETS Prepaid Card was launched in December 2021. These account-based cards replaced the former EZ-Link and NETS FlashPay cards that supported card-based ticketing. Transactions using account-based cards are processed backend, hence commuters are unable to see their fare deduction and card value balance at MRT fare gates and bus readers.

Criticisms
There has been some criticisms by the public that the auto-top up service by GIRO for the new CEPAS card will require an administration fee for activation as well as for each top-up. In contrast, auto-top up for the original EZ-Link card was free. Also, the public has complained that there is now more hassle in applying for this service in contrast to the relatively easier process for the original version.

See also
 EZ-Link
 NETS FlashPay

References

External links
 Specification for Contactless ePurse Application (CEPAS)

Science and technology in Singapore
Mass Rapid Transit (Singapore)